Eumelea ludovicata is a moth of the family Geometridae first described by Achille Guenée in 1858. It is found in Indo-Australian tropics of India, Sri Lanka, east to Singapore, Taiwan, the Solomon Islands and Guam.

Biology
The adult has a fluttering, erratic flight. The male is more reddish, whereas female is yellowish.

The caterpillar has a cylindrical yellowish-white body with many longitudinal lines. Setae minute and spiracles greenish. Its round-shaped head is yellowish white with rusty markings. Hairs are present, which are short, erect and thick. Host plant is always Macaranga species. Pupa elongate with semi-elliptical, flattened cremaster. Pupal case for the proboscis and antennae extends free. Caterpillar resting straight at 60 degrees to the leaf surface, which is often confused as a twig. Pupation occurs between two leaves fastened together coated inside with silk.

Subspecies
Eight subspecies have been recognized.

Eumelea ludovicata biclarata Prout, 1931
Eumelea ludovicata cupreata Warren, 1897
Eumelea ludovicata enantia Prout, 1921
Eumelea ludovicata fulvida Prout, 1921
Eumelea ludovicata referta Prout, 1931
Eumelea ludovicata rhodeogyna Prout, 1925
Eumelea ludovicata rubra Prout, 1921
Eumelea ludovicata salomonis Prout, 1921

Gallery

References

External links
Final instar caterpillar and metamorphosis of Eumelea ludovicata Guenee, 1857, in Singapore

Moths of Asia
Moths described in 1858